Kʼicheʼ  (pronounced ;) are indigenous peoples of the Americas and are one of the Maya peoples. The Kʼicheʼ language is a Mesoamerican language in the Mayan language family. The highland Kʼicheʼ states in the pre-Columbian era are associated with the ancient Maya civilization, and reached the peak of their power and influence during the Mayan Postclassic period (–1539 AD).

The meaning of the word  is "many trees". The Nahuatl translation,  "Place of the Many Trees (People)", is the origin of the word Guatemala. Quiché Department is also named for them. Rigoberta Menchú Tum, an activist for indigenous rights who won the Nobel Peace Prize in 1992, is perhaps the best-known Kʼicheʼ person.

People

According to the 2011 census, Kʼicheʼ people constituted 11% of the Guatemalan population, accounting for 1,610,013 people out of a total of 14,636,487. The large majority of Kʼicheʼ people live in the highlands of Guatemala, notably in the departments of El Quiché, which is 65.1% Kʼicheʼ and has a total Kʼicheʼ population of 622,163; Totonicapán, which is 95.9% Kʼicheʼ and has a total Kʼicheʼ population of 453,237; Quetzaltenango, which is 25.9% Kʼicheʼ and has a total Kʼicheʼ population of 205,228; and Sololá, which is 35.3% Kʼicheʼ and has a total Kʼicheʼ population of 151,992.

El Quiché forms the heartland of the Kʼicheʼ people. In pre-Columbian times, the Kʼicheʼ settlements and influence reached beyond the highlands, including the valley of Antigua and coastal areas in Escuintla.

Most Kʼicheʼ speak their native language and have at least a working knowledge of Spanish. Exceptions are in some remote and isolated rural communities, where the people speak only Kʼicheʼ. Maya languages closely related to Kʼicheʼ are Uspantek, Sakapultek, Kaqchikel and Tzutujil.

History 

The history of the Kʼicheʼ people can be divided into two main historical periods, pre-conquest and post-conquest. Conquest occurred in 1524 with the arrival of the conquistador Pedro de Alvarado, who conducted war against this people.

Pre-Conquest 
In pre-Conquest times, the Kʼicheʼ Kingdom of Qʼumarkaj was one of the most powerful states in the region. Kʼiche was an independent state that existed after the decline of the Maya Civilization with the Classic collapse (c.300 – c.950 AD). Kʼicheʼ lay in a highland mountain valley of present-day Guatemala; during this time they were also found in parts of El Salvador.

The major city of the Kʼicheʼ in the western highlands of Guatemala was Qʼumarkaj. It was the political, ceremonial and social center of the Kʼicheʼ people. The city covered an estimated area of 3.25 km2 across the Resguardo plateau. There is also evidence for a large degree of cultural exchange between the Kʼicheʼ and the people of Central Mexico. Linguists have found Nahuatl influences in the Kʼicheʼ language. Up until the 16th centruy before conquest K'iche were one of the literate civilizations in the world creating heirogliphs which helped preserve their culture.

 Post-Conquest 
The Kʼicheʼ were conquered by the conquistador Pedro de Alvarado in 1524. Their last military commander, Tecun Uman, led the Kʼicheʼ armies against the combined forces of Alvarado and his allies, the Kaqchikel. The battle took place in the valley of Xelajú (Quetzaltenango) where the Kʼicheʼ armies were defeated and close to 10,000 Kʼicheʼ died, including Tecún Umán. Tecún has since been an important legendary figure in the Kʼicheʼ oral tradition. After the battle, the Kʼicheʼ surrendered and invited Alvarado to their capital, Qʼumarkaj. However, Alvarado suspected an ambush and had the city burned. The ruins of the city can still be seen, just a short distance from Santa Cruz del Quiché.

One of the main missions of the Spanish clergy during the conquest was to convert the Mesoamerican people to Catholic Christianity. Though they never fully converted the people, they did affect their language. The Kʼicheʼ people were one of the first groups studied by the Catholic missionary religious order known as the Dominicans. The Franciscans established Theologia Indorum, a Christian theology text written in the Kʼicheʼ native language and adapting K'iche' concepts to Catholicism. The text was meant to be a tool for converting the Kʼicheʼ and other Mesoamerican groups to Christianity. To accomplish this, the Dominicans attempted to change the meaning of some native words to better reflect their Catholic concepts. They also used similar word, sentence, and rhythmic structure to the Popol Vuh to create similarities between the texts.

 Twentieth century 
In the early 1980s, the government of Guatemala, under the leadership of Efraín Ríos Montt, carried out a massive campaign to quell both the rebellions largely organized by the Mayan people and the spread of liberation ideas inspired by the Catholic church.  Because the K’iche’ are the largest Maya group within Guatemala, they became a major target of the counterinsurgency programs, which became known as the Guatemalan genocide by many of the native people.  The tactics of the Guatemalan army to fight the insurgency ranged from desecrating sacred symbols and burning crops to raping Mayan women, mutilating and displaying Mayan bodies, and coercing Mayan men into Civil Defense Patrols.  According to the Guatemalan Historical Clarification Commission, Mayans in Southern K’iche’ were 98.4% of total victims.

Because of the disproportionate targeting of native peoples, the K’iche’ people who inhabit Southern Quiché continue to be affected by the government's counterinsurgency programs.  However, scholars have pointed out the differences between Western ideas of trauma and the Latin American understanding.  The Guatemalan Historical Clarification Commission has emphasized the need for mental health solutions that highlight community development and human rights.  Previous efforts to provide relief have included encouraging natives to provide testimonies on Ríos Montt's actions, reburying family members who were previously thrown in mass graves, and training community volunteers to accompany affected people and provide support.Twenty First CenturyUp until 2012 Rios Montt served in Congress which granted him immunity from prosecution. When he served his last term in 2012 that immunity was gone. In 2013, Rios Montt and his armed forces were charged with massacres of 15 villages in the K'iche' area.Rios Montt declared innocence throughout the trial. He was convicted for his crimes against humanity and sentenced to 80 years in prison but only served 5 months. Rios Montt's conviction was overturned by Constitutional court issuing a retrial that was delayed when a judge recused herself. eventually in 2017, the retrial began but Rios Montt was diagnosed with dementia and the trial was closed to the public and Rios de Montt was not required to be there. He died while the trial was going at his home in April 2018. 

 Notable figures 

 Kʼicheʼ rulers 
The origin of the elite Kʼicheʼ rulers is debated but scholars widely believe that the warlords traveled to the Guatemalan highlands in AD 1225. They began their migration after the collapse of the Yucatàn Maya center of Chichén Itzá, which is believed to have taken place around AD 1200. The elite warlords followed the Rio Usumacinta drainage, the Rio Negro, and Rio Agua Caliente until they crossed into the San Andres Basin, where they began early Kʼicheʼ settlements. These warlords were in small groups that were very mobile and consisted mostly of men. They began to intermingle with the local Kʼicheʼ populations soon after their arrival. A chronological list of the rulers can be made by using generation lengths from the first ruler and so on.

 Tecun Uman 

Declared Guatemala's national hero in 1960, Tecun Uman was the last of the K'iche' rulers.  His death on February 20, 1524 is memorialized each year by the Guatemalan people.  This is done, in part, through the Dance of the Conquest, which tells the story of the natives’ conversion to Christianity following the Spanish Conquest.  K’iche’ documents, such as the Título Xucul, detail his immense wealth, stating that he wore quetzal feathers, rare gems, and abundant jewelry.

Some scholars doubt the existence of Tecun Uman as a historical figure, citing stories of the leader flying as a quetzal or an eagle in K’iche’ stories.  Other scholars claim that, instead, Tecun Uman’s legacy is the result of a romanticized version of a historical figure.

 Rigoberta Menchú Tum 
Rigoberta Menchú Tum is an indigenous rights activist who was awarded the Nobel Peace Prize in 1992.  As a young woman, Menchu began advocating for the women’s rights movement through the Catholic Church in Guatemala.  She later joined the Committee for Peasant Unity (CUC) along with her father to advocate for better labor conditions for farmers.  During the rule of General Efrain Rios Montt, Menchú protested the government's counterinsurgency programs with her family, claiming that they were the result of cultural and socioeconomic tensions.  After her father, mother, and brother were murdered by the Guatemalan government for their involvement in these protests, Menchú fled to Mexico.  While in exile, she published her autobiography, which highlighted the Guatemalan Civil War and the violence committed against her family and the K'iche' people.

In 1996, Rigoberta Menchu became a UN Ambassador for the world’s indigenous peoples and helped promote the first International Decade of the World's Indigenous People.  Since then, she has run for President of Guatemala in both 2007 and 2011 as a member of the left-leaning Winaq party but lost both elections by a large majority.Luis Enrique Sam Colop'''

Luis Enrique Sam Colop is a K'iche' writer who is most know for his accomplishment in translating the Popol Wuj from K'iche' to Spanish and editing it to modern Spanish while bringing back the poetry element. Luis was born a native K'iche' speaker and also learned Spanish. He went to school at Rafael Landivar University in Guatemala graduating with a degree in Law. He got his  masters degree in linguistics from the University of Iowa. Additionally, he holds a doctorate in English from the State University of New York with a dissertation on mayan poetry. For his work on the Popol Wuj he received a grant from the John Simon Guggenheim Memorial Foundation for advanced professionals.

 Literature 
 Popol Vuh 
One of the most significant surviving Mesoamerican literary documents and primary sources of knowledge about Maya societal traditions, beliefs and mythology is a product of the 16th-century Kʼicheʼ people. This document, known as the Popol Vuh ("Pop wuj" in proper Kʼiche – "the book of events") and originally written around the 1550s, contains a compilation of mythological and ethno-historical narratives known to these people at that time. These were drawn from earlier pre-Columbian sources (now lost) and also oral traditions. This sacred narrative includes their creation myth, relating how the world and humans were created by the gods, the story of the divine brothers, and the history of the Kʼicheʼ from their migration into their homeland up to the Spanish conquest.

The Popol Vuh, from its creation to present day, has developed as an important symbol of indigenous culture for both present-day Guatemalans and people of Mayan descent. This sacred text has been used in religious and spiritual ceremonies, university studies, political movements and protests, and historical research into the lives of the Mayans and, more specifically, the Kʼicheʼ people. In 1971 it was declared the official book of Guatemala. The Popol Vuh has been used by people of Mayan descent in present-day Guatemala to defend their traditional lands and political rights in order to preserve their indigenous culture. To this day, the Popol Vuh continues to be analyzed and studied to better understand the spiritual beliefs and practices of the Maya, and how these have shaped present-day cultures.

References

Bibliography

 
 
 

External links
 Kʼicheʼ – an introduction – article at Citizendium''
 Allen J. Christenson's Kʼicheʼ--English Dictionary
 A reversal, the English--Kʼicheʼ Dictionary
Rigoberta Menchú Tum - article at Nobel Peace Center

Indigenous peoples in Guatemala
Baja Verapaz Department
Quetzaltenango Department
Quiché Department
Sololá Department
Suchitepéquez Department
Totonicapán Department
Indigenous peoples in El Salvador
Maya peoples of Guatemala
Mesoamerican cultures